Mantr is a 2018 Indian Marathi film directed by Devendra Shinde. The film stars Saurabh Gogate, Deepti Devi, Manoj Joshi, Shubhankar Ekbote, and Pushkaraj Chirputkar in pivo tal roles. The film was jointly produced by Filmart Productions, North East Films, Shri Productions, and Zenyth Media House.

Plot 
A boy from a family of Purohits, a family of Preachers, was not keen to take up the family profession, but due to a friend's advice, he accepts the Purohit's family job in Germany. The story revolves around him.

Cast 
The cast of the film is as follows:

 Saurabh Gogate as Niranjan
 Deepti Devi as Antara
 Manoj Joshi as Shridhar Pant
 Pushkaraj Chirputkar as Kashinath
 Anuradha Marathe as Niranjan's Aaji
 Shubhangi Damle as Antara's Aaji
 Amruta Joshi as Antara's Sister
 Vishwajit Joshi as Mr. Raste
 Siddheshwar Zadbuke as Ambavane
 Shubhankar Ekbote as Sunny
 Sujay Jadhav as David
 Vrushali Katkar as Niranjan's Aai
 Dhiresh Joshi as Rangnath Kaka
 Sunil Abhyankar as Mrdamle. Nadkarni
 Rajesh Katkar as Antara's Father 
 Manjusha Vaidya as Antara's Mother

References

External links 

2018 films
2010s Marathi-language films
Indian drama films